Munakata may refer to:

Munakata (surname)
Munakata, Fukuoka, a city in Japan
Munakata Taisha, a Shinto shrine in Fukuoka